The 2022–23 season is F.C. Motagua's 76th season in existence and the club's 57th consecutive season in the top fight of Honduran football.  In addition to the domestic league, the club will also competed in the 2022 CONCACAF League and the 2023 CONCACAF Champions League.

Overview
After winning their 18th title last season, the club will try to repeat under the management of Hernán Medina.  In the first semester, the club was able to reach the 2022 CONCACAF League semifinals, where they lost to hometown rivals C.D. Olimpia.  In December, they reach the finals of the Apertura season, however, felt short grabbing the title.

Kits
The 2022–23 home, away and third kits were published on 22 July.

Players

Transfers in

Transfers out

Squad

 Only league matches into account

Goalkeeper's action

International caps

This is a list of players that were playing for Motagua during the 2022–23 season and were called to represent Honduras at different international competitions.

Results
All times are local CST unless stated otherwise

Preseason and friendlies

Apertura

Clausura

CONCACAF League

CONCACAF Champions League

Statistics

References

External links
 Official website

F.C. Motagua seasons
Motagua
Motagua